Eçara (officially known as İcarə until 2013) is a village in the Jalilabad Rayon of Azerbaijan. It forms part of the municipality of Ləzran

References 

Populated places in Jalilabad District (Azerbaijan)